"Pearly Gates" is a song by American recording artist Pitbull, featuring Nayer. It was released on February 1, 2010. The song was written by Pitbull, alongside the song's producers Jim Jonsin and DJ Noodles, but it is written around the Bryan Adams hit song "Heaven". The song was included as an iTunes bonus track on Pitbull's fourth studio album Pitbull Starring in Rebelution.

Music video
This music video was directed by David Rousseau, and features both Pitbull and Nayer. The video is currently available from G-Pain, who is known for his viral video "Sophia Grace & Rosie meet Nicki Minaj" on YouTube, but an active upload of the music video has gained over 11.5 million views as of April 2020.

Track listing
"Pearly Gates"  – 3:22

Charts

Release history

References

2010 singles
Pitbull (rapper) songs
Song recordings produced by Jim Jonsin
Songs written by Jim Jonsin
Songs written by Pitbull (rapper)
2010 songs
Songs written by Bryan Adams
Songs written by Jim Vallance